Arsenije IV Jovanović Šakabenta (1698 – 18 January 1748) was the Archbishop of Peć and Serbian Patriarch from 1725 to 1737 and Head of the Serbian Orthodox Church in Habsburg Monarchy from 1737 to his death in 1748.

He commissioned the Slavic heraldic bearings called Stemmatographia. He opened the first official Academy of Painting on the territory of the Metropolitanate of Karlovci after the artistic and cultural reforms were commenced under the auspices and blessing of Vikentije Jovanović, his predecessor. He was succeeded by Joannicius III of Constantinople.

Biography

Treaty of Belgrade

With the 1739 Treaty of Belgrade which ended the Austro-Turkish War (1737–1739), the Kingdom of Serbia ceased to exist. The Ottoman sultan deposed the pro-Serbian Patriarch of Peć Arsenije IV and in his place appointed the Greek Joannicius, who took the title of Archbishop of Peć and Patriarch of the Serbs.

The previous Patriarch Arsenije IV moved north to the Habsburg monarchy along with many Serbs, in what is known as the Second Serbian Migration. Arsenije IV became Metropolitan of Karlovci, maintaining however deep connections with the Serbs who remained in the Ottoman Empire, particularly the Kosovo Vilayet, now under the Phanariote jurisdiction of Joannicius. Joannicius remained Patriarch of Peć until 1746, when, burdened with debts due to his high-living, he was forced to sell the title to pay his creditors. He was succeeded by Atanasije II (Gavrilović).

Title
Arsenije signed himself "Arsenije, By the Grace of God, Archbishop of Peć and Patriarch of all Serbs and Bulgarians and all of Illyria". Another style was "Archbishop of All Serbs, Bulgarians, Western Pomorje, Dalmatia, Bosnia, both halves of Danube and all of Illyria".

See also
Great Serb Migrations
Metropolitanate of Karlovci
List of heads of the Serbian Orthodox Church

References

Sources

External links
 Official site of the Serbian Orthodox Church: Serbian Archbishops and Patriarchs

1698 births
1748 deaths
18th-century Serbian people
18th-century Eastern Orthodox bishops
Arsenije
History of the Serbian Orthodox Church
Ottoman Serbia
Vojvodina under Habsburg rule
Eastern Orthodox Christians from Serbia
People from Peja
Metropolitans of Karlovci